August 2 - Eastern Orthodox liturgical calendar - August 4

All fixed commemorations below are observed on August 16 by Orthodox Churches on the Old Calendar.

For August 3, Orthodox Churches on the Old Calendar commemorate the Saints listed on July 21.

Saints

 Holy Myrrh-bearer Salome (1st century)
 Hieromartyr Stephen, Pope of Rome, and Companions (257)  (see also: August 2)
 Venerable Saints Isaac (383), Dalmatius, and Faustus (5th century), ascetics of the Dalmatian Monastery at Constantinople.
 Protomartyr Rajden (Razhdenes) of Tsromi and Nikozi, Georgia (457)
 Saint Cosmas of Palestine, eunuch and hermit (6th century)
 Martyr Olympios the Prefect (Olympius the Eparch), Byzantine noble martyred under the Persian King Chosroes II for confessing the Orthodox Faith (c. 610-641)
 Saint John of Patalaria Monastery, Confessor and Abbot (8th-9th centuries)
 Venerable Theoclita  (Theokliti) the Wonderworker, of Optimaton (Theme of the Optimatoi) (ca. 842)
 Saints John the Monastic, and John the New, Bishops of Ephesus.
 Venerable Nuns Theodora, and Theopisti her daughter, of Aegina, in Thessaloniki (892)

Pre-Schism Western saints

 Saint Aspren (Aspronas), Bishop of Naples (1st century)
 Saint Euphronius, Bishop of Autun in France and a friend of St Lupus of Troyes, Confessor (c. 475)
 Saint Trea, hermitess, converted to Orthodoxy by St Patrick, she spent the rest of her life as an anchoress in Ardtree, now in County Londonderry, Northern Ireland (5th century)
 Saint Faustus, son of St Dalmatius of Pavia in Italy, lived the life of a holy monk (5th century)
 Saint Senach (Snach), a disciple of St Finian and his successor as Abbot of Clonard in Ireland (6th century)
 Saint Benno, hermit on Mt Etzel in Switzerland, a founder of the monastery of Einsiedeln, became Bishop of Metz in 927 (940)
 Saint Gregory of Nonantula, Abbot of Nonantola Abbey near Modena in Italy (933)

Post-Schism Orthodox saints

 Venerable Anthony the Roman, Abbot in Novgorod (1147)
 Nine Kherkheulidze brothers, their mother and sister, and 9,000 others, who suffered on the field of Marabda, Georgia (1625)

New martyrs and confessors

 New Hieromartyr Viacheslav Lukanin, Deacon (1918)
 New Hieromartyr Nicholas Pomerantsev, Priest (1938)

Other commemorations

 Repose of Hiero-schemamonk Ignatius of Harbin (1958)

Icon gallery

Notes

References

Sources
 August 3 / August 16. Orthodox Calendar (PRAVOSLAVIE.RU).
 August 16 / August 3. HOLY TRINITY RUSSIAN ORTHODOX CHURCH (A parish of the Patriarchate of Moscow).
 August 3. OCA - The Lives of the Saints.
 The Autonomous Orthodox Metropolia of Western Europe and the Americas (ROCOR). St. Hilarion Calendar of Saints for the year of our Lord 2004. St. Hilarion Press (Austin, TX). p. 57.
 Menologion: The Third Day of the Month of August. Orthodoxy in China.
 August 3. Latin Saints of the Orthodox Patriarchate of Rome.
 The Roman Martyrology. Transl. by the Archbishop of Baltimore. Last Edition, According to the Copy Printed at Rome in 1914. Revised Edition, with the Imprimatur of His Eminence Cardinal Gibbons. Baltimore: John Murphy Company, 1916. pp. 230-231.
 Rev. Richard Stanton. A Menology of England and Wales, or, Brief Memorials of the Ancient British and English Saints Arranged According to the Calendar, Together with the Martyrs of the 16th and 17th Centuries. London: Burns & Oates, 1892. pp. 378-379.

 Greek Sources
 Great Synaxaristes:  3 ΑΥΓΟΥΣΤΟΥ. ΜΕΓΑΣ ΣΥΝΑΞΑΡΙΣΤΗΣ.
  Συναξαριστής. 3 Αυγούστου. ECCLESIA.GR. (H ΕΚΚΛΗΣΙΑ ΤΗΣ ΕΛΛΑΔΟΣ).

 Russian Sources
  16 августа (3 августа). Православная Энциклопедия под редакцией Патриарха Московского и всея Руси Кирилла (электронная версия). (Orthodox Encyclopedia - Pravenc.ru).

August in the Eastern Orthodox calendar